...Saturday Night, 'Round Ten is a live album by the Australian rock band, You Am I, released in 1999.

The performances are taken from three sets the band played in a warehouse in Richmond, Victoria. "Round Ten" was released as a radio only single. A recording of "The Cream And The Crock" from the same gigs was released as a B-side to the Internet-only single "Who Put the Devil in You". A cover version of the MC5 song, "Ramblin' Rose", is included as an unlisted hidden track at the end of the album.

This was the first album with Davey Lane as a member of the band.

Track listing
"Arse-Kickin' Lady from the North-West"
"Mr. Milk"
"Jaimme's Got a Gal"
"Stray"
"Gasoline for Two"
"Fifteen"
"Berlin Chair"
"Junk"
"Minor Byrd"
"Heavy Heart"
"'Round Ten"
"Purple Sneakers"
"Cathy's Clown"
"Rumble"
"Trike"
"How Much Is Enough"
"Ramblin' Rose" (unlisted)

Ignorance and Vodka
Initial pressings came with a bonus disc entitled Ignorance and Vodka which included five rare and/or unreleased tracks plus a fifteen-minute band biography as a CD-ROM feature, which featured clips from the recording of the main album.

"Useless Information"
"Have You Plum Gone... (And Given Up On Me)"
"Bring The Ole Sun Down"
"You Want It So Bad"
"The Choices That I've Made"

Charts

References

External links
 SAT NITE ROUND TEN
 CD-slip from "...Saturday night, 'round ten'"

1999 albums
You Am I albums
Bertelsmann Music Group albums